Ethmia fumidella is a moth in the family Depressariidae. It can be found in Spain, Portugal, Austria, Hungary, Romania, Greece, Turkey and on Crete.

Subspecies
Ethmia fumidella fumidella (Austria, Hungary, Romania, Greece, Turkey, Crete)
Ethmia fumidella turcica de Lattin, 1963 (Asia Minor)
Ethmia fumidella delattini Agenjo, 1964 (Spain, Portugal)

References

Moths described in 1850
fumidella
Moths of Europe
Insects of Turkey